Phibalomyia is a genus of horse flies in the family Tabanidae.

Distribution
Queensland.

Species
Phibalomyia carteri (Taylor, 1917)

References

Brachycera genera
Tabanidae
Diptera of Australasia